Ray DeSilva (born 3 February 1967) is a Bermudian sailor. He competed in the men's 470 event at the 1992 Summer Olympics.

References

External links
 

1967 births
Living people
Bermudian male sailors (sport)
Olympic sailors of Bermuda
Sailors at the 1992 Summer Olympics – 470
Place of birth missing (living people)